This is a list of notable awards Saturday Night Live has won. One of the longest running series on U.S. television at 47 seasons as of 2021, since its debut, the show has won and been nominated for numerous awards, both creative and technical. The show has won 87 Primetime Emmy Awards, 3 Peabody Awards, and 5 Writers Guild of America Awards. Lorne Michaels, co-creator and executive producer, received a star on the Hollywood Walk of Fame for his work on the series.

Total awards and nominations for the cast

American Cinema Editors Awards

American Comedy Awards

Annie Awards

Art Directors Guild Awards

ASIFA East Animation Festival Awards

BET Comedy Awards

Black Reel Awards for Television

Costume Designers Guild Awards

Critics' Choice Television Awards

Directors Guild of America Awards

Dorian Awards

Grammy Awards

Hollywood Critics Association TV Awards

Make-Up Artists and Hair Stylists Guild Awards

MTV Movie & TV Awards

NAACP Image Awards

Online Film & Television Association Awards

Ottawa International Animation Festival

Peabody Awards

People's Choice Awards

Poppy Awards

Primetime Emmy Awards

Outstanding Contemporary Hairstyling for a Variety, Nonfiction or Reality Program

Outstanding Contemporary Makeup for a Variety, Nonfiction or Reality Program (Non-Prosthetic)

Outstanding Costumes for a Variety, Nonfiction or Reality Programming

Outstanding Directing for a Variety Series

Outstanding Directing for a Variety Special

Outstanding Documentary or Nonfiction Special

Outstanding Guest Actor in a Comedy Series

Outstanding Guest Actress in a Comedy Series

Outstanding Individual Performance in a Variety or Music Program

Outstanding Interactive Program

Outstanding Lighting Design / Lighting Direction for a Variety Series

Outstanding Lighting Design / Lighting Direction for a Variety Special

Outstanding Main Title Design

Outstanding Music Direction

Outstanding Original Music and Lyrics

Outstanding Picture Editing for Variety Programming

Outstanding Production Design for a Variety, Reality or Competition Series

Outstanding Prosthetic Makeup for a Series, Limited Series, Movie or Special

Outstanding Short Form Nonfiction or Reality Series

Outstanding Sound Mixing for a Variety Series or Special

Outstanding Stunt Coordination for a Comedy Series or Variety Program

Outstanding Supporting Actor in a Comedy Series

Note

Outstanding Supporting Actress in a Comedy Series

Outstanding Technical Direction, Camerawork, Video Control for a Limited Series, Movie or Special

Outstanding Technical Direction, Camerawork, Video Control for a Series

Outstanding Variety Series

Outstanding Variety Sketch Series

Outstanding Variety Special

Outstanding Writing for a Variety Series

Outstanding Writing for a Variety Special

Prism Awards

Producers Guild of America Awards

Satellite Awards

Saturn Awards

Set Decorators Society of America Awards

Teen Choice Awards

Television Critics Association Awards

TV Guide Awards

TV Land Awards

Webby Awards

Writers Guild of America Awards

References
General
 
 
 
 

Specific

Awards
Saturday Night Live